The 2017–18 Dinamo Moscow season was the club's first season back in the Russian Premier League, following their relegation at the end of the 2015–16 season. Dynamo finished the season in 8th place, whilst being knocked out of the Russian Cup by Spartak Nalchik.

Season Events
On 7 October, manager Yuriy Kalitvintsev left Dynamo Moscow by Mutual consent, with Dmitri Khokhlov being appointed as Kalitvintsev's successor.

Squad
As of 22 January 2018, according to the FNL official website

Out on loan

Transfers

Summer

In:

Out:

Winter

In:

Out:

Competitions

Russian Premier League

Results by round

Results

League table

Russian Cup

Squad statistics

Appearances and goals

|-
|colspan="14"|Players away from the club on loan:
|-
|colspan="14"|Players who left Dynamo Moscow during the season:

|}

Goal scorers

Disciplinary record

References

FC Dynamo Moscow seasons
Dynamo Moscow